The city of Lower Hutt, New Zealand, was first proclaimed a borough on 1 February 1891. Prior to this it had been part of Hutt County, initially as a Roads Board and from 1881 as a Town Board. Since 2019, the mayor has been Campbell Barry.

List of mayors
Key

References

 
Lower Hutt